Ciuleandra is a 1985 Romanian drama film directed by Sergiu Nicolaescu. The film was selected as the Romanian entry for the Best Foreign Language Film at the 58th Academy Awards, but was not accepted as a nominee.

Cast
  as Puiu Faranga
  as Mădălina 
 
 Gheorghe Cozorici
 
 
 Ștefan Iordache

See also
 List of submissions to the 58th Academy Awards for Best Foreign Language Film
 List of Romanian submissions for the Academy Award for Best Foreign Language Film

References

External links
 

1985 films
1985 drama films
Romanian drama films
1980s Romanian-language films
Films based on works by Liviu Rebreanu
Films directed by Sergiu Nicolaescu